The Runaway Jury is a legal thriller novel written by American author John Grisham. It was Grisham's seventh novel. The hardcover first edition was published by Doubleday Books in 1996.  Pearson Longman released the graded reader edition in 2001.  The novel was published again in 2003 to coincide with the release of Runaway Jury, a movie adaptation of the novel starring Gene Hackman, Dustin Hoffman, John Cusack and Rachel Weisz.  The third printing bears a movie-themed cover, in place of the covers used on the first and second printings.

Plot
Wendall Rohr and his team of tort lawyers have filed suit on behalf of plaintiff Celeste Wood, whose husband died of lung cancer, against the tobacco company Pynex. The trial is to be held in Biloxi, Mississippi, a state thought to have favorable tort laws and sympathetic juries. Before the jury in the Pynex trial has been sworn in, a stealth juror, Nicholas Easter, has begun to quietly connive behind the scenes, in concert with a mysterious woman known only as Marlee.

Rankin Fitch, a shady "consultant" who has directed eight successful trials for the tobacco industry, has placed a camera in the courtroom in order to observe the proceedings in his office nearby, plotting many schemes to reach to the jury. He plans to get to Millie Dupree through blackmailing her husband through a tape that has him trying to bribe an official. He gets to Lonnie Shaver by convincing a company to buy his employer and convince him through orientation. He also tries to reach Rikki Coleman through blackmail of revealing her abortion to her husband. As the case continues, Fitch is approached by Marlee with a proposal to "buy" the verdict.

Meanwhile, Easter works from the inside to gain control of the jury – being warm-hearted, sympathetic and helpful to jurors who might be won over, and rather ruthless to those who prove impervious to his efforts. Eventually, he becomes jury foreman after the previous one falls ill (resulting from Nicholas spiking his coffee). He also manages to hoodwink and repeatedly manipulate the judge. Meanwhile, Marlee  Easter's partner/lover  acts as his agent on the outside, convincing Fitch that Easter controls the jury and can deliver any verdict on demand through a series of highly secretive meetings, in which Marlee repeatedly threatens to disappear if Fitch's team attempts to track her.

Marlee gives Fitch the impression that the pair's objective is purely mercenary – to sell the verdict to highest bidder. Still, he makes a great effort to discover her true name and antecedents to satisfy his mounting curiosity. This turns out to be extremely difficult, and the detectives employed by Fitch express their grudging respect for her skill in hiding her tracks. As the trial reaches its climax, Fitch – still in the dark about Marlee's past – agrees to her proposal to pay $10 million for a favorable verdict. Only after the money is irrevocably transferred to an offshore account do the detectives discover the truth: Marlee is in fact an anti-smoking activist whose parents both died from smoking. Thus, Fitch realizes that he lost Pynex's $10 million in addition to having lost the trial.

Inside the closed jury room, Easter convinces the jury to find for the plaintiff and make a large monetary award – $2 million in compensatory damages, and $400 million in punitive damages. While not able to sway the entire jury, Easter gets nine out of twelve jurors to back him – sufficient for a valid verdict in a civil case. Pynex and its defense lawyers are devastated. In the Cayman Islands, Marlee short-sells the tobacco companies' stocks and makes an enormous gain on the original $10 million. Easter quickly disappears from Biloxi and leaves the US. While Easter and Marlee are now wealthy and satisfied that they served justice, the tobacco industry, once undefeatable, are now vulnerable to an avalanche of additional lawsuits.

The book closes with Marlee returning the initial $10 million bribe to Fitch, having almost doubled the money on the derivatives market, and warning Fitch that she and Easter will always be watching. She explains that she had no intention to steal or lie, and that she cheated only because, "That was all your client understood."

List of major characters
Wendall Rohr: A successful tort lawyer who sues big corporations. He tried the case in his home state of Mississippi.

Durwood Cable: The main defense lawyer. Rival and sometimes friend of Wendall Rohr.

Rankin Fitch: A "consultant" for the "Big Four" tobacco companies. Directed eight trials, engineered two mistrials. Known for using unethical schemes to win the trials.

Nicholas Easter: The decisive juror of the trial. Real name is Jeff Kerr. Also had identifications of David Lancaster and Perry Hirsch; used to try to enter previous cases, but failed. Had two years of law school before he met Marlee.

Marlee: The girlfriend and outside contact of Nicholas Easter. Real name is Gabrielle Brant. Parents died due to smoking. Has since meeting Jeff Kerr, schemed to follow and benefit from tobacco litigation.

Frederick Harkin: The judge in the case Wood v. Pynex

Loreen Duke: Black female juror. Divorced with two children. Voted for plaintiff.

Angel Weese: Fellow black female juror. Boyfriend is Derrick Maples, who was bribed by Rohr to try to convince Angel to vote for plaintiff. Although this attempt was unsuccessful, she nevertheless voted for plaintiff.

Lonnie Shaver:  Black male juror. Manager of supermarket, later convinced by new employer to vote for defense. Employer was friend of one of the tobacco companies.

Stella Hulic: Obnoxious white female social climber. Later got removed due to being followed by tobacco company. However, it was actually Marlee who phoned Stella and stated that the tobacco companies followed her.

Frank Herrera: Retired white male colonel. Later removed for having unauthorized materials. Those materials were actually planted by Nicholas secretly to have Herrera, a pro-defense juror and very antagonistic to Nicholas, removed.

Herman Grimes: The previous white blind male foreman. Very neutral, follows judge's orders very devotedly. Removed due to a sudden illness on the final morning of the trial. This illness was secretly created by Nicholas through drugging Herman.

Critical reception
The New York Times wrote: "The story's suspense builds like that of a lengthening cigarette ash that refuses to drop off. And the plot's eventual outcome is far more entertainingly unpredictable than anything Mr. Grisham has done before." The Chicago Tribune wrote that "the guts of the book is the cat-and-mouse game played by Marlee, Easter and Fitch, and it is probably Grisham's best storytelling to date."

References

1996 American novels
Novels by John Grisham
Legal thriller novels
American novels adapted into films
Novels set in Mississippi
Biloxi, Mississippi